Ideal Marriage: Its Physiology and Technique is a famous popular scientific treatise and self-help book published in London in 1926 by Dutch gynecologist Theodoor Hendrik van de Velde, retired director of the Gynecological Clinic in Haarlem, and "one of the major writers on human sexuality during the early twentieth century" (Frayser & Whitby, p. 300).  It was the best-known work on its subject for several decades, and was reprinted 46 times in the original edition.  After World-War Two, it sold over a half-million copies. A revised edition was published in 1965. and a subsequent one in 2000 (Melody & Pearson, p. 96).

It proclaimed the "critical goal of marriage consists of sexual pleasure shared by husband and wife" (Melody and Person, p. 93). A 2000 edition of the book described itself as concentrating "on the cultivation of the technique of eroticism as an art in marriage."

Frederica Mathewes-Green, in the National Review, described it as

The first printing had an insert: "The sale of this book is strictly limited to members of the medical profession, Psychoanalysts, Scholars, and to such adults as may have a definite position in the field of Physiological, Psychological, or Social Research."  It was placed on the Index Librorum Prohibitorum in 1931.

References

 .
 .
 
 .
 .
 
 .
 Arnold A. Lazarus "Working Effectively and Efficiently with Couples" The Family Journal, Vol. 8, No. 3, 222–28 (2000)

Contemporary Reviews
 .

External links 
 1947 English edition at archive.org

Sexology
1929 non-fiction books